Breze Peak is the mostly ice-covered peak rising to 1634 m in eastern Havre Mountains, northern Alexander Island in Antarctica. It surmounts Russian Gap to the northeast and Foreman Glacier to the west.  The peak was visited on 8 January 1988 by the geological survey team of Christo Pimpirev and Borislav Kamenov (First Bulgarian Antarctic Expedition), and Philip Nell and Peter Marquis (British Antarctic Survey).

The feature is named after the settlements of Breze in Southern and Western Bulgaria.

Location

Maps
 British Antarctic Territory. Scale 1:200000 topographic map. DOS 610 – W 69 70. Tolworth, UK, 1971
 Antarctic Digital Database (ADD). Scale 1:250000 topographic map of Antarctica. Scientific Committee on Antarctic Research (SCAR). Since 1993, regularly upgraded and updated

Notes

References
 Bulgarian Antarctic Gazetteer. Antarctic Place-names Commission. (details in Bulgarian, basic data in English)
 Breze Peak. SCAR Composite Gazetteer of Antarctica

External links
 Breze Peak. Copernix satellite image

Mountains of Alexander Island
Bulgaria and the Antarctic